Mostaq Ahmad Chowdhury Who is known as Mostaq Mia. Bangladesh Awami League politician. He was elected a member of parliament from Undivided Chittagong-17 (Cox's Bazar Sadar-Ramu) in 1973 and Cox's Bazar-3 in 1991. He was the organizer of the Liberation War of Bangladesh.

Early life 
Mostaq Ahmad Chowdhury was born in Cox's Bazar District⋅ His father was Mamtaz Ahmad Chowdhury Khan Bahadur. His wife Kaniz Fatema Mostaq is the president of Cox's Bazar District Women's Awami League and the chairman of Cox's Bazar Jatiya Mohila Songstha. They have one son and one daughter.

Career 
Mostaq Ahmad Chowdhury is the chairman of Cox's Bazar district council. He was earlier the administrator of Cox's Bazar district council. In the 1970, he was elected as an MP for the first time as an independent candidate from the then Chittagong-17 (Cox's Bazar Sadar-Ramu) constituency. Then in the first parliamentary elections of 1973, he was elected as a Member of Parliament from the then Chittagong-17 (Cox's Bazar Sadar-Ramu) constituency on the nomination of Awami League for the second time. He was re-elected as an MP from Cox's Bazar-3 (Sadar-Ramu) constituency in the fifth national election in 1991.

He was the organizer of the Liberation War of Bangladesh.

He lost the 7th Jatiya Sangsad elections of 12 June 1996 and the 8th Jatiya Sangsad of 2001 from the same constituency with the nomination of Awami League.

References 

Living people
People from Cox's Bazar District
Awami League politicians
1st Jatiya Sangsad members
5th Jatiya Sangsad members
Year of birth missing (living people)
2nd Jatiya Sangsad members